The Optionally Manned Fighting Vehicle (OMFV) is a U.S. Army program to replace the M2 Bradley infantry fighting vehicle. OMFV is one part of the Next Generation Combat Vehicle portfolio of programs.

After the cancelation of the Ground Combat Vehicle in February 2014, the Army's M2 Bradley replacement effort was restarted under the Future Fighting Vehicle (FFV) program. The Army had US$50 million unspent from the GCV program to re-appropriate to the FFV. FFV was a research and development program to develop notional plans for IFVs. A decision on whether to pursue additional development beyond blueprints wasn't expected to come until 2016, according to Brig. Gen David Bassett, commander of PEO Ground Combat Systems.

Original competition 

In August 2014 General Dynamics Land Systems and BAE Systems Land and Armaments were awarded $7.9 million each to develop technologies from the Ground Combat Vehicle program. In May 2015, General Dynamics and BAE were awarded a further $28 million. Citing budget constraints, in August 2015, the Army delayed the FFV's acquisition decision from FY2021 to FY2029. The Army said it was choosing to instead work on short-term capability gaps.

In November 2016 Army officials said they were standing up a Next Generation Combat Vehicle program to field a family of combat vehicles by 2035. Officials said this strategy was not necessarily going to be centered around an infantry fighting vehicle, but would likely be a family of vehicles that could potentially replace the M1 Abrams, Bradley Fighting Vehicle, Mobile Protected Firepower and even the Stryker. Army official conceded that the program was as yet unfunded.

In June 2018, the Army established the Next Generation Combat Vehicle (NGCV) program to replace the M2 Bradley. In October 2018, the program was re-designated as the Optionally Manned Fighting Vehicle (OMFV). The NGCV program was expanded as a portfolio of next-generation vehicles including tanks and the Bradley-based Armored Multi-Purpose Vehicle. In March 2019 the Army issued a request for proposals.

By January 2020, the pool of competitors had narrowed down a variant of the Lynx KF41 developed as a joint venture between Raytheon and Rheinmetall, and the Griffin III developed by General Dynamics Land Systems. The Raytheon-Rheinmetall prototype was disqualified after failing to meet a deadline to ship the prototype to Aberdeen Proving Ground by the required date., The sole remaining competitor, GDLS, was also disqualified because its prototype was too heavy to meet requirements that two fit in a single C-17.

The aggressive pace and stringent objectives of the program were seen as unrealistic by potential competitors. The program placed much of the cost burden of development on private contractors, causing many major contractors forego participation. Acknowledging this, in February 2020, the Army announced it would restart the program with more responsibility for funding being taken on by the service.

Rebooted program 
In July 2021, the Army awarded contracts to five teams: Point Blank Enterprises, Oshkosh Defense, BAE Systems, General Dynamics Land Systems and American Rheinmetall Vehicles. The total value of the contract was $299.4 million. Teams will develop concept designs during the 15-month long phase. All entries had to meet three general criteria: a tracked vehicle with a hybrid-electric drive; an unmanned turret housing a 50 mm autocannon, or a 30 mm turret with the ability to upgrade to the larger caliber; and a reduced crew of two with space to carry six infantrymen. The Army plans to pick three teams to move on to building prototypes by mid-2023.

See also 
 Armored Systems Modernization, 1980s–1990s U.S. Army family of combat vehicles concept
 Ground Combat Vehicle, a U.S. Army infantry fighting vehicle acquisition program canceled in 2014
 M1296 Dragoon, an infantry carrier vehicle of the Stryker family
 Armored Multi-Purpose Vehicle, a U.S. Army acquisition program to replace the  M113 APC

References

External links 
Oshkosh Defense OMFV page

Post–Cold War armored fighting vehicles of the United States